A statue of Umashimadenomikoto by Akira Sano is installed in Tokyo's Hamarikyu Gardens, in Japan.

External links
 

Buildings and structures in Chūō, Tokyo
Outdoor sculptures in Tokyo
Sculptures of men in Japan
Statues in Japan